John Barton (15th century) was an English writer on Lollardy.

Barton appears to have flourished in the reign of Henry V, to whom he dedicated his 'Confutatio Lollardorum.' A manuscript copy of this work is preserved in the library of All Souls' College, Oxford, written in a hand which Henry Octavius Coxe assigned to the 15th century. Other manuscripts of this author are mentioned by Thomas Tanner, who wanted to identify him with a certain John Barton, Esq., buried in St. Martin's Church, Ludgate, 1439. Tanner says that he was possibly chancellor of Oxford; but he fails to give any authority. Barton's own description of himself, as quoted by John Bale was 'plain John Barton, the physician.'

References

Attribution

Year of birth missing
Year of death missing
15th-century English writers
15th-century English people
English non-fiction writers
English male non-fiction writers